The CMS Grammar School in Bariga, a suburb of Lagos in Lagos State, is the oldest secondary school in Nigeria, founded on 6 June 1859 by the Church Missionary Society. For decades it was the main source of African clergymen and administrators in the Lagos Colony.

Foundation
The seed funding for CMS Grammar School, Lagos was made possible by James Pinson Labulo Davies who in April 1859 provided Babington Macaulay with £50 (equivalent of ₦1.34 million as of 2014) to buy books and equipment for the school. With the seed funding Macaulay opened CMS Grammar School on 6 June 1859,which made it the first secondary school in Nigeria. In 1867, Davies contributed another £100 (₦2.68 million as of 2014) toward a CMS Grammar School Building Fund. Other contributors to the CMS Building Fund were non Saros such as Daniel Conrad Taiwo AKA Taiwo Olowo who contributed £50. Saro contributors also included men such as Moses Johnson, I.H. Willoughby, T.F. Cole, James George, and Charles Foresythe who contributed £40. The CMS Grammar School in Freetown, founded in 1848, served as a model.

The school began with six students, all boarders in a small, single story building called the 'Cotton House' at Broad Street.
The first pupils were destined to be clergymen.
The curriculum included English, Logic, Greek, Arithmetic, Geometry, Geography, History, Bible Knowledge and Latin.
The first principal of the school was the scholar and theologian Babington Macaulay, who served until his death in 1878. He was the father of Herbert Macaulay.
When the British colony of Lagos was established in 1861, the colonial authorities obtained most of their African clerical and administrative staff from the school.

Principals
 Babington Macaulay, 1859–1878.
 Henry Johnson, 1879–1881 (acting).
 Isaac Oluwole, 1881–1893.
 James Johnson, 1893–1894 (acting).
 E. A. Godson, 1894–1895.
 Melville Jones 1895–1896 (acting)
 Joseph Suberu Fanimokun, 1896–1914.
 E. J. Evans, 1915–1927.
 A. Hobson, 1927–1929.
 F. Watherton 1929–1932.
 J. Olumide Lucas, 1932–1935 (acting).
 C. G. Thorne, 1935–1936.
 Solomon Odunaiya Odutola, 1936–1938. (acting)
 Leonard John Lewis, 1938–1943.
 Seth Irunsewe Kale, 1944–1950.
 B. A. Adelaja, 1950–1970.
 T. A. Ojo, 1970–1972, (acting).
 I. A. Olowu 1972–1984.
 B. A. Nigwo, 1984–1986.
 J. B. A. Edema, 1986–1997.
 Taiwo O. Jemilugba, 1997–2001.
 Johnson Onayinka, 2001–2005.
 Tunde Oduwole, 2005–2017
 OlaOluwa Adeyemi, 2017–2018
 Sunday O. Sofekun, 2021
 Venerable Victor A. Olusa (Administrator) 2021 till date

Alumni

Some notable alumni:
                                                                          

High Chief Edem Duke (born 1955), 
Federal Minister Culture, Tourism & National Orientation, Supervising Minister of Information
9ice (born 1980), musician
Adebesin Folarin (1877-1949), lawyer and historian
Adeyemo Alakija (1884–1952), media entrepreneur and co-founder of Daily Times of Nigeria
Adeniji Adele (1893–1964), Oba (King) of Lagos from 1 October 1949, to 12 July 1964
Akin Babalola Kamar Odunsi, businessman and Senator
Akin Euba (born 1935), professor of music
Akintola Williams (born 1919), accountant
Alexander Akinyele (1875–1968), Bishop
Ayodele Awojobi (1937–84), academic and activist
Babs Fafunwa (1923–2010), Federal Minister of Education
Bode Thomas (1918–53), politician
Candido Da Rocha (1860–1959), businessman
Charles A. Adeogun-Phillips (born 1966), lawyer
Dandeson Crowther, Archbishop of the Niger and son of Samuel Ajayi Crowther
Dare Art Alade, musician
Ernest Shonekan (born 1936), President of Nigeria
Fela Sowande (1905–87), musician and composer
Frederick Rotimi Williams (1920–2005), lawyer
George Da Costa (1853–1929), photographer
GOK Ajayi (21 May 1931 – 31 March 2014), Prominent Nigerian Jurist
Henry Adefope (1926–2012), Minister of External Affairs
Henry Fajemirokun, Business Magnate
Herbert Macaulay (1864–1946), surveyor and nationalist
Israel Oludotun Ransome-Kuti (1891–1955), Educationist and father of Olikoye Ransome-Kuti, Beko Ransome-Kuti, and Fela Kuti
Ibikunle Akitoye (1871–1928), Oba of Lagos
J. K. Randle (1909–1956), Businessman and Socialite
Karim Olowu (born 1924), athlete
Kitoye Ajasa (1866–1937), lawyer and politician
Niyi Adebayo (born 1958), Governor, Ekiti State
Mobolaji Bank Anthony (11 June 1907 – 26 May 1991), President of the Lagos Stock Exchange
Oguntola Sapara (1861–1935), medical doctor, gynaecologist.
Ola Vincent (1925–2012), Governor of the Central Bank of Nigeria
Oluyombo Awojobi (1963-1969), Rural Surgeon
Oliver Ogedengbe Macaulay, son of Herbert Macaulay, journalist, and nationalist
Remi Fani-Kayode (1921–95), politician
Samuel Herbert Pearse (born 1865), businessman
Samuel Manuwa (1903–76), surgeon
Isaac Delano (1904-1979), author, linguist, teacher
Talabi Braithwaite (1928–2011), insurance broker
Taslim Olawale Elias (1914–91), Chief Justice of Nigeria
Thomas King Ekundayo Phillips (1884–1969), musicologist, father of Nigerian church music
Thomas Leighton Decker (1916–78), linguist and journalist
T. O. S. Benson (1917–2008), lawyer, politician
Tunji Sowande (1912–96), lawyer and musician
Victor Adetunji Haffner (born 1919), engineer
Wahab Goodluck (died 1991), President, Nigeria Labour Congress

References

Secondary schools in Lagos State
History of Lagos
1859 establishments in the Kingdom of Lagos
Education in Lagos State
Schools in Lagos
Educational institutions established in 1859
Anglican schools in Nigeria